Paolo Villaluna is a Filipino film, television and TV commercial director.

Career
Villaluna's short films have been screened in film festivals including Yamagata, Clermont-Ferrand, and Rotterdam.

ILUSYON (Illusion) was awarded with CJ Selections at the 2006 Busan International Film Festival.

In 2007, his second film SELDA (The Inmate) was the first Filipino film to be accepted in the main competition of both the Montreal World Film Festival and the Thessaloniki International Film Festival. Sid Lucero and Emilio Garcia tied as Best Actors in Thessaloniki for the film.

The “Love Trilogy” ended with 2009's WALANG HANGGANG PAALAM (Endless Farewell) which won the Best World Showcase award in Soho International Film Festival in New York in 2010.

In 2009, he made his TV directorial debut with STORYLINE for the ABS-CBN New Channel. His television work has garnered back-to-back Gawad Tanglaw awards, a Catholic Mass Media award and New York Film Festival medals.

In 2010, he began to work for advertising as an in-house director for the country's biggest TVC production supplier, Filmex.

His fourth and latest film is 2016's PAUWI NA (Pedicab), which won the Golden Goblet Award at the 20th Shanghai International Film Festival. It also won six awards in the Tofarm Film Festival including the Special Jury Prize and Best Acting for leading actors Bembol Roco and Cherry Pie Picache.

Villaluna has written opinion pieces and directed short documentaries for Rappler.

Full-Feature Films

Short films

Awards and nominations

References

Year of birth missing (living people)
Living people
Filipino film directors
Filipino television directors
University of the Philippines Los Baños alumni